Machteld Anna Mulder (born 21 February 1989 in Wijdenes) is a Dutch middle distance runner.

Career highlights

European Youth Olympic Festival
2005 - Lignano, 3rd, 800 m

European Junior Championships
2007 - Hengelo, 3rd, 800 m

Dutch National Championships
2007 - Ghent, 2nd, 400 m  ind.
2007 - Amsterdam, 1st, 800 m
2009 - Apeldoorn, 2nd, 800 m ind.
2009 - Amsterdam, 1st, 800 m

World Junior Championships
2008 - Bydgoszcz, 3rd, 800 m

Personal bests

External links

Atletiekunie profile

1989 births
Living people
Dutch female middle-distance runners
People from Venhuizen
Sportspeople from North Holland
20th-century Dutch women
21st-century Dutch women